The bigeye houndshark (Iago omanensis) is a species of houndshark, belonging to the family Triakidae. It is found in the deep waters of the continental shelves in the western Indian Ocean, from the Red Sea to southwestern India, between latitudes 30° N and 10° N, at depths between 110 and 2,200 m. Its length is up to 37 cm.

References 

 

bigeye houndshark
Fish of the Red Sea
Marine fauna of Western Asia
Fish of Pakistan
Gulf of Oman
bigeye houndshark